Microlaimidae is a family of nematodes belonging to the order Desmodorida.

Genera

Genera:
 Acanthomicrolaimus Stewart & Nicholas, 1987
 Aponema Jensen, 1978
 Bathynox Bussau & Vopel, 1999

References

Nematodes